Transgenerational epigenetic inheritance is the transmission of epigenetic markers and modifications from one generation to multiple subsequent generations without altering the primary structure of DNA (i.e., the sequence of nucleotides). Thus, the regulation of genes via epigenetic mechanisms can be heritable; the amount of transcription and proteins produced can be mitigated by inherited epigenetic changes. The less precise term "epigenetic inheritance" may cover both cell–cell and organism–organism information transfer. Although these two levels of epigenetic inheritance are equivalent in unicellular organisms, they may have distinct mechanisms and evolutionary distinctions in multicellular organisms.

It is important to note that the inheritance of epigenetic marks in the immediate generation is referred to as intergenerational inheritance. In male mice, the epigenetic signal is maintained through the F1 generation. In female mice, the epigenetic signal is maintained through the F2 generation as a result of the exposure of the germline in the womb. Many epigenetic signals are lost beyond the F2/F3 generation and are no longer inherited, because the subsequent generations were not exposed to the same environment as the parental generations. The signals that are maintained beyond the F2/F3 generation are referred to as transgenerational epigenetic inheritance (TEI) since their presence is due to inheritance rather than to the presence of the environmental stimulus. There are several mechanisms of TEI that have shown to affect germline reprograming, transgenerational increases in susceptibility to diseases, mutations, and stress inheritance.

Epigenetic categories

Four general categories of epigenetic modification are known:
 self-sustaining metabolic loops, in which an mRNA or protein product of a gene stimulates transcription of the gene; e.g. Wor1 gene in Candida albicans;
 structural templating in which structures are replicated using a template or scaffold structure on the parent; e.g. the orientation and architecture of cytoskeletal structures, cilia and flagella, prions, proteins that replicate by changing the structure of normal proteins to match their own;
 chromatin marks, in which methyl or acetyl groups bind to DNA nucleotides or histones thereby altering gene expression patterns; e.g. Lcyc gene in Linaria vulgaris described below;
 RNA silencing, in which small RNA strands interfere (RNAi) with the transcription of DNA or translation of mRNA; known only from a few studies, mostly in Caenorhabditis elegans.

Inheritance of epigenetic marks

Although there are various forms of inheriting epigenetic markers, inheritance of epigenetic markers can be summarized as the dissemination of epigenetic information by means of the germline. Furthermore, epigenetic variation typically takes one of four general forms, though there are other forms that have yet to be elucidated. Currently, self-sustaining feedback loops, spatial templating, chromatin marking, and RNA-mediated pathways modify epigenes of individual cells. Epigenetic variation within multicellular organisms is either endogenous or exogenous. Endogenous is generated by cell–cell signaling (e.g. during cell differentiation early in development), while exogenous is a cellular response to environmental cues.

Removal vs. retention

In sexually reproducing organisms, much of the epigenetic modification within cells is reset during meiosis (e.g. marks at the FLC locus controlling plant vernalization), though some epigenetic responses have been shown to be conserved (e.g. transposon methylation in plants). Differential inheritance of epigenetic marks due to underlying maternal or paternal biases in removal or retention mechanisms may lead to the assignment of epigenetic causation to some parent of origin effects in animals and plants.

Reprogramming
In mammals, epigenetic marks are erased during two phases of the life cycle. Firstly just after fertilization and secondly, in the developing primordial germ cells, the precursors to future gametes. During fertilization the male and female gametes join in different cell cycle states and with different configuration of the genome. The epigenetic marks of the male are rapidly diluted. First, the protamines associated with male DNA are replaced with histones from the female's cytoplasm, most of which are acetylated due to either higher abundance of acetylated histones in the female's cytoplasm or through preferential binding of the male DNA to acetylated histones. Second, male DNA is systematically demethylated in many organisms, possibly through 5-hydroxymethylcytosine. However, some epigenetic marks, particularly maternal DNA methylation, can escape this reprogramming; leading to parental imprinting.

In the primordial germ cells (PGC) there is a more extensive erasure of epigenetic information. However, some rare sites can also evade erasure of DNA methylation. If epigenetic marks evade erasure during both zygotic and PGC reprogramming events, this could enable transgenerational epigenetic inheritance.

Recognition of the importance of epigenetic programming to the establishment and fixation of cell line identity during early embryogenesis has recently stimulated interest in artificial removal of epigenetic programming. Epigenetic manipulations may allow for restoration of totipotency in stem cells or cells more generally, thus generalizing regenerative medicine.

Retention
Cellular mechanisms may allow for co-transmission of some epigenetic marks. During replication, DNA polymerases working on the leading and lagging strands are coupled by the DNA processivity factor proliferating cell nuclear antigen (PCNA), which has also been implicated in patterning and strand crosstalk that allows for copy fidelity of epigenetic marks. Work on histone modification copy fidelity has remained in the model phase, but early efforts suggest that modifications of new histones are patterned on those of the old histones and that new and old histones randomly assort between the two daughter DNA strands. With respect to transfer to the next generation, many marks are removed as described above. Emerging studies are finding patterns of epigenetic conservation across generations. For instance, centromeric satellites resist demethylation. The mechanism responsible for this conservation is not known, though some evidence suggests that methylation of histones may contribute. Dysregulation of the promoter methylation timing associated with gene expression dysregulation in the embryo was also identified.

Decay
Whereas the mutation rate in a given 100-base gene may be 10−7 per generation, epigenes may "mutate" several times per generation or may be fixed for many generations. This raises the question: do changes in epigene frequencies constitute evolution? Rapidly decaying epigenetic effects on phenotypes (i.e. lasting less than three generations) may explain some of the residual variation in phenotypes after genotype and environment are accounted for. However, distinguishing these short-term effects from the effects of the maternal environment on early ontogeny remains a challenge.

Contribution to phenotypes

The relative importance of genetic and epigenetic inheritance is subject to debate. Though hundreds of examples of epigenetic modification of phenotypes have been published, few studies have been conducted outside of the laboratory setting. Therefore, the interactions of genes and epigenes with the environment cannot be inferred despite the central role of environment in natural selection. Experimental methodologies for manipulating epigenetic mechanisms are nascent (e.g.) and will need rigorous demonstration before studies explicitly testing the relative contributions of genotype, environment, and epigenotype are feasible.

In plants
Studies concerning transgenerational epigenetic inheritance in plants have been reported as early as the 1950s. One of the earliest and best characterized examples of this is b1 paramutation in maize. The b1 gene encodes a basic helix-loop-helix transcription factor that is involved in the anthocyanin production pathway. When the b1 gene is expressed, the plant accumulates anthocyanin within its tissues, leading to a purple coloration of those tissues. The B-I allele (for B-Intense) has high expression of b1 resulting in the dark pigmentation of the sheath and husk tissues while the B' (pronounced B-prime) allele has low expression of b1 resulting in low pigmentation in those tissues. When homozygous B-I parents are crossed to homozygous B', the resultant F1 offspring all display low pigmentation which is due to gene silencing of b1. Unexpectedly, when F1 plants are self-crossed, the resultant F2 generation all display low pigmentation and have low levels of b1 expression. Furthermore, when any F2 plant (including those that are genetically homozygous for B-I) are crossed to homozygous B-I, the offspring will all display low pigmentation and expression of b1. The lack of darkly pigmented individuals in the F2 progeny is an example of non-Mendelian inheritance and further research has suggested that the B-I allele is converted to B' via epigenetic mechanisms. The B' and B-I alleles are considered to be epialleles because they are identical at the DNA sequence level but differ in the level of DNA methylation, siRNA production, and chromosomal interactions within the nucleus. Additionally, plants defective in components of the RNA-directed DNA-methylation pathway show an increased expression of b1 in B' individuals similar to that of B-I, however, once these components are restored, the plant reverts to the low expression state. Although spontaneous conversion from B-I to B' has been observed, a reversion from B' to B-I (green to purple) has never been observed over 50 years and thousands of plants in both greenhouse and field experiments. s

Examples of environmentally induced transgenerational epigenetic inheritance in plants has also been reported. In one case, rice plants that were exposed to drought-simulation treatments displayed increased tolerance to drought after 11 generations of exposure and propagation by single-seed descent as compared to non-drought treated plants. Differences in drought tolerance was linked to directional changes in DNA-methylation levels throughout the genome, suggesting that stress-induced heritable changes in DNA-methylation patterns may be important in adaptation to recurring stresses. In another study, plants that were exposed to moderate caterpillar herbivory over multiple generations displayed increased resistance to herbivory in subsequent generations (as measured by caterpillar dry mass) compared to plants lacking herbivore pressure. This increase in herbivore resistance persisted after a generation of growth without any herbivore exposure suggesting that the response was transmitted across generations. The report concluded that components of the RNA-directed DNA-methylation pathway are involved in the increased resistance across generations. Transgenerational epigenetic inheritance has also been observed in polyploid plants. Genetically identical reciprocal F1 hybrid triploids have been shown to display transgenerational epigenetic effects on viable F2 seed development.

In humans
Transgenerational epigenetic inheritance in humans has never been conclusively proven and can be difficult to separate from the direct inheritance of culture and environment.

One environment that human offspring commonly share for nine months is the womb, and the environment during the fetal stages of development can have long lasting effects on the health of offspring. An example is the Dutch famine of 1944–1945 and its causal effect on induced epigenetic inherited diseases in the children and even grandchildren of pregnant women. This is an example of intergenerational inheritance via fetal programming as the unborn child (and that unborn child's developing ovaries) were directly exposed to the environment in utero. Evidence for transgenerational inheritance would require the epigenetic effects to remain in the great-grandchildren ("F3") - the first generation with no direct exposure.

The loss of genetic expression which results in Prader–Willi syndrome or Angelman syndrome has in some cases been found to be caused by epigenetic changes (or "epimutations") on both the alleles, rather than involving any genetic mutation. In all 19 informative cases, the epimutations that, together with physiological imprinting and therefore silencing of the other allele, were causing these syndromes were localized on a chromosome with a specific parental and grandparental origin.

Specifically, the paternally derived chromosome carried an abnormal maternal mark at the SNURF-SNRPN, and this abnormal mark was inherited from the paternal grandmother.

Similarly, epimutations on the MLH1 gene has been found in two individuals with a phenotype of hereditary nonpolyposis colorectal cancer, and without any frank MLH1 mutation which otherwise causes the disease. The same epimutations were also found on the spermatozoa of one of the individuals, indicating the potential to be transmitted to offspring.

In addition to epimutations to the MLH1 gene, it has been determined that certain cancers, such as breast cancer, can originate during the fetal stages within the uterus.

Furthermore, evidence collected in various studies utilizing model systems (i.e. animals) have found that exposure during parental generations can result in multigenerational and transgenerational inheritance of breast cancer.

More recently, studies have discovered a connection between the adaptation of male germinal cells via pre-conception paternal diets and the regulation of breast cancer in developing offspring. More specifically, studies have begun to uncover new data that underscores a relationship between transgenerational epigenetic inheritance of breast cancer and ancestral alimentary components or associated markers, such as birth weight.

By utilizing model systems, such as mice, studies have shown that stimulated paternal obesity at the time of conception can epigenetically alter the paternal germ-line. The paternal germ-line is responsible for regulating their daughters’ weight at birth and the potential for their daughter to develop breast cancer.

Furthermore, it was found that modifications to the miRNA expression profile of the male germline is coupled with elevated body weight. Additionally, paternal obesity resulted in an increase in the percentage of female offspring developing carcinogen-induced mammary tumors, which is caused by changes to mammary miRNA expression.

Aside from cancer related afflictions associated with the effects of transgenerational epigenetic inheritance, transgenerational epigenetic inheritance has recently been implicated in the progression of pulmonary arterial hypertension (PAH).

Recent studies have found that transgenerational epigenetic inheritance is likely to be involved in the progression of PAH because current therapies for PAH do not repair the irregular phenotypes associated with this disease. Current treatments for PAH have attempted to correct symptoms of PAH with vasodilators and antithrombotic protectors, but neither has effectively alleviated the complications related to the impaired phenotypes associated with PAH. The inability of vasodilators and antithrombotic protectants to correct PAH suggests that the progression of PAH is dependent upon multiple variables, which is likely to be consequent of transgenerational epigenetic inheritance.

Specifically, it is thought that transgenerational epigenetics is linked to the phenotypic changes associated with vascular remodeling. For example, hypoxia during gestation may induce transgenerational epigenetic alterations that could prove to be detrimental during the early phases of fetal development and increase the possibility of developing PAH as an adult.

Taking the potential effects of transgenerational epigenetics during fetal development into consideration is derived from the fetal origins of adult disease (FOAD) hypothesis, which is related to the concept of fetal programming.

Though hypoxic states could induce the transgenerational epigenetic variance associated with PAH, there is strong evidence to support that a variety of maternal risk factors are linked to the eventual progression of PAH. Such maternal risk factors linked to late-onset PAH includes placental dysfunction, hypertension, obesity, and preeclampsia. These maternal risk factors and environmental stressors coupled with transgenerational epigenetic changes can result in prolonged insult to the signaling pathways associated with the vascular development during fetal stages, thus increasing the likelihood of having PAH.

One study has shown childhood abuse, which is defined as "sexual contact, severe physical abuse and/or severe neglect," leads to epigenetic modifications of glucocorticoid receptor expression.

Glucocorticoid receptor expression plays a vital role in hypothalamic-pituitary-adrenal (HPA) activity. Additionally, animal experiments have shown that epigenetic changes can depend on mother-infant interactions after birth.

Furthermore, a recent study investigating the correlations between maternal stress in pregnancy and methylation in teenagers/their mothers has found that children of women who were abused during pregnancy were more likely to have methylated glucocorticoid-receptor genes. Thus, children with methylated glucocorticoid-receptor genes experience an altered response to stress, ultimately leading to a higher susceptibility of experiencing anxiety.

Additional studies examining the effects of diethylstilbestrol (DES), which is an endocrine disruptor, have found that the grandchildren (third-generation) of women exposed to DES significantly increased the probability of their grandchildren developing attention-deficit/hyperactivity disorder (ADHD). This is because women exposed to endocrine disruptors, such as DES, during gestation may be linked to multigenerational neurodevelopmental deficits.

Furthermore, animal studies indicate that endocrine disruptors have a profound impact on germline cells and neurodevelopment. The cause of DES's multigenerational impact is postulated to be the result of biological processes associated with epigenetic reprogramming of the germline, though this has yet to be determined.

Effects on fitness

Epigenetic inheritance may only affect fitness if it predictably alters a trait under selection. Evidence has been forwarded that environmental stimuli are important agents in the alteration of epigenes. Ironically, Darwinian evolution may act on these neo-Lamarckian acquired characteristics as well as the cellular mechanisms producing them (e.g. methyltransferase genes).
Epigenetic inheritance may confer a fitness benefit to organisms that deal with environmental changes at intermediate timescales. Short-cycling changes are likely to have DNA-encoded regulatory processes, as the probability of the offspring needing to respond to changes multiple times during their lifespans is high. On the other end, natural selection will act on populations experiencing changes on longer-cycling environmental changes. In these cases, if epigenetic priming of the next generation is deleterious to fitness over most of the interval (e.g. misinformation about the environment), these genotypes and epigenotypes will be lost. For intermediate time cycles, the probability of the offspring encountering a similar environment is sufficiently high without substantial selective pressure on individuals lacking a genetic architecture capable of responding to the environment. Naturally, the absolute lengths of short, intermediate, and long environmental cycles will depend on the trait, the length of epigenetic memory, and the generation time of the organism.
Much of the interpretation of epigenetic fitness effects centers on the hypothesis that epigenes are important contributors to phenotypes, which remains to be resolved.

Deleterious effects

Inherited epigenetic marks may be important for regulating important components of fitness. In plants, for instance, the Lcyc gene in Linaria vulgaris controls the symmetry of the flower. Linnaeus first described radially symmetric mutants, which arise when Lcyc is heavily methylated. Given the importance of floral shape to pollinators, methylation of Lcyc homologues (e.g. CYCLOIDEA) may have deleterious effects on plant fitness. In animals, numerous studies have shown that inherited epigenetic marks can increase susceptibility to disease. Transgenerational epigenetic influences are also suggested to contribute to disease, especially cancer, in humans. Tumor methylation patterns in gene promoters have been shown to correlate positively with familial history of cancer. Furthermore, methylation of the MSH2 gene is correlated with early-onset colorectal and endometrial cancers.

Putatively adaptive effects
Experimentally demethylated seeds of the model organism Arabidopsis thaliana have significantly higher mortality, stunted growth, delayed flowering, and lower fruit set, indicating that epigenes may increase fitness. Furthermore, environmentally induced epigenetic responses to stress have been shown to be inherited and positively correlated with fitness. In animals, communal nesting changes mouse behavior increasing parental care regimes and social abilities that are hypothesized to increase offspring survival and access to resources (such as food and mates), respectively.

Inheritance of immunity 
In 2021, it was shown for the first time how immunity is inherited – via epigenetic changes – in mammals (mice).

Macroevolutionary patterns
Inherited epigenetic effects on phenotypes have been well documented in bacteria, protists, fungi, plants, nematodes, and fruit flies. Though no systematic study of epigenetic inheritance has been conducted (most focus on model organisms), there is preliminary evidence that this mode of inheritance is more important in plants than in animals. The early differentiation of animal germlines is likely to preclude epigenetic marking occurring later in development, while in plants and fungi somatic cells may be incorporated into the germ line.

It is thought that transgenerational epigenetic inheritance can enable certain populations to readily adapt to variable environments. Though there are well documented cases of transgenerational epigenetic inheritance in certain populations, there are questions to whether this same form of adaptability is applicable to mammals. More specifically, it is questioned if it applies to humans. As of late, most of the experimental models utilizing mice and limited observations in humans have only found epigenetically inherited traits that are detrimental to the health of both organisms. These harmful traits range from increased risk of disease, such as cardiovascular disease, to premature death. However, this may be based on the premise of limited reporting bias because it is easier to detect negative experimental effects, opposed to positive experimental effects. Furthermore, considerable epigenetic reprogramming necessary for the evolutionary success of germlines and the initial phases of embryogenesis in mammals may be the potential cause limiting transgenerational inheritance of chromatin marks in mammals.  

Life history patterns may also contribute to the occurrence of epigenetic inheritance. Sessile organisms, those with low dispersal capability, and those with simple behavior may benefit most from conveying information to their offspring via epigenetic pathways. Geographic patterns may also emerge, where highly variable and highly conserved environments might host fewer species with important epigenetic inheritance.

Controversies

Humans have long recognized that traits of the parents are often seen in offspring. This insight led to the practical application of selective breeding of plants and animals, but did not address the central question of inheritance: how are these traits conserved between generations, and what causes variation? Several positions have been held in the history of evolutionary thought.

Blending vs. particulate inheritance

Addressing these related questions, scientists during the time of the Enlightenment largely argued for the blending hypothesis, in which parental traits were homogenized in the offspring much like buckets of different colored paint being mixed together. Critics of Charles Darwin's On the Origin of Species, pointed out that under this scheme of inheritance, variation would quickly be swamped by the majority phenotype. In the paint bucket analogy, this would be seen by mixing two colors together and then mixing the resulting color with only one of the parent colors 20 times; the rare variant color would quickly fade.

Unknown to most of the European scientific community, the monk Gregor Mendel had resolved the question of how traits are conserved between generations through breeding experiments with pea plants. Charles Darwin thus did not know of Mendel's proposed "particulate inheritance" in which traits were not blended but passed to offspring in discrete units that we now call genes. Darwin came to reject the blending hypothesis even though his ideas and Mendel's were not unified until the 1930s, a period referred to as the modern synthesis.

Inheritance of innate vs. acquired characteristics

In his 1809 book, Philosophie Zoologique, Jean-Baptiste Lamarck recognized that each species experiences a unique set of challenges due to its form and environment. Thus, he proposed that the characters used most often would accumulate a "nervous fluid." Such acquired accumulations would then be transmitted to the individual's offspring. In modern terms, a nervous fluid transmitted to offspring would be a form of epigenetic inheritance.

Lamarckism, as this body of thought became known, was the standard explanation for change in species over time when Charles Darwin and Alfred Russel Wallace co-proposed a theory of evolution by natural selection in 1859. Responding to Darwin and Wallace's theory, a revised neo-Lamarckism attracted a small following of biologists, though the Lamarckian zeal was quenched in large part due to Weismann's famous experiment in which he cut off the tails of mice over several successive generations without having any effect on tail length. Thus the emergent consensus that acquired characteristics could not be inherited became canon.

Revision of evolutionary theory
Non-genetic variation and inheritance, however, proved to be quite common. Concurrent with the 20th-century development of the modern evolutionary synthesis (unifying Mendelian genetics and natural selection), C. H. Waddington (1905-1975) was working to unify developmental biology and genetics. In so doing, he adopted the word "epigenetic" to represent the ordered differentiation of embryonic cells into functionally distinct cell types despite having identical primary structure of their DNA. Researchers discussed Waddington's epigenetics sporadically - it became more of a catch-all for puzzling non-genetic heritable characters rather than a concept advancing the body of inquiry. Consequently, the definition of Waddington's word has itself evolved, broadening beyond the subset of developmentally signaled, inherited cell specialization.

Some scientists have questioned whether epigenetic inheritance compromises the foundation of the modern synthesis. Outlining the central dogma of molecular biology, Francis Crick succinctly stated, "DNA is held in a configuration by histone[s] so that it can act as a passive template for the simultaneous synthesis of RNA and protein[s]. None of the detailed 'information' is in the histone." However, he closes the article stating, "this scheme explains the majority of the present experimental results!" Indeed, the emergence of epigenetic inheritance (in addition to advances in the study of evolutionary-development, phenotypic plasticity, evolvability, and systems biology) has strained the current framework of the modern evolutionary synthesis, and prompted the re-examination of previously dismissed evolutionary mechanisms.

Furthermore, patterns in epigenetic inheritance and the evolutionary implications of the epigenetic codes in living organisms are connected to both Lamarck's and Darwin's theories of evolution. For example, Lamarck postulated that environmental factors were responsible for modifying phenotypes hereditarily, which supports the constructs that exposure to environmental factors during critical stages of development can result in epimutations in germlines, thus augmenting phenotypic variance. In contrast, Darwin’s theory claimed that natural selection strengthened a populations ability to survive and remain reproductively fit by favoring populations that are able to readily adapt. This theory is consistent with intergenerational plasticity and phenotypic variance resulting from heritable adaptivity.

In addition, some epigenetic variability may provide beneficial plasticity, so that certain organisms can adapt to fluctuating environmental conditions. However, the exchange of epigenetic information between generations can result in epigenetic aberrations, which are epigenetic traits that deviate from the norm. Therefore, the offspring of the parental generations may be predisposed to specific diseases and reduced plasticity due to epigenetic aberrations. Though the ability to readily adapt when faced with a new environment may be beneficial to certain populations of species that can quickly reproduce, species with long generational gaps may not benefit from such an ability. If a species with a longer generational gap does not appropriately adapt to the anticipated environment, then the reproductive fitness of the offspring of that species will be diminished.

There has been critical discussion of mainstream evolutionary theory by Edward J Steele, Robyn A Lindley and colleagues, Fred Hoyle and N. Chandra Wickramasinghe, Yongsheng Liu Denis Noble, John Mattick and others that the logical inconsistencies as well as Lamarckian Inheritance effects involving direct DNA modifications, as well as the just described indirect, viz. epigenetic, transmiss'ions, challenge conventional thinking in evolutionary biology and adjacent fields.

See also 
 Contribution of epigenetic modifications to evolution
 Överkalix study
 Dutch famine of 1944–45#Legacy
 Transgenerational stress inheritance
 Epigenetics of anxiety and stress–related disorders
 Epigenetics
 Transgenerational epigenetic inheritance in plants
 Transgenerational trauma

References 

Epigenetics
Extended evolutionary synthesis